The 2000 Summer Paralympic Games or the XI Summer Paralympics  were held in Sydney, New South Wales, Australia, between 18 and 29 October. The Sydney Paralympics was last time that the Summer Paralympics which were organized by two different Organizing Committees. In this edition, a record 3,801 athletes from 120 National Paralympic Committees participated in 551 events in 18 sports and until the 2006 Commonwealth Games held in Melbourne,was the second largest sporting event ever held in Australia and the Southern Hemisphere. Sydney was the eighth city to host the Olympics and the Paralympics on same venues at the same year, and the first since Barcelona 1992 that they were organized in conjunction with the Olympics. They were also the first Paralympic Games outside the Northern Hemisphere and also in Oceania.

Host city bid process 
On 9–13 September 1993, during the 10th International Paralympic Committee (IPC) Executive Board Session the entity carried out an assessment and announced that four (Beijing, Berlin, Manchester and Sydney) of the five finalist cities for the 2000 Summer Olympics had met the specific conditions to host the Paralympic Games.

It was not mandatory that candidate cities host both the Olympic and Paralympic Games, but motivated by the events in the lead up to the 1996 Summer Paralympics, the International Olympic Committee (IOC) decided in 1993 that the newly created International Paralympic Committee (IPC) would become a stakeholder in the Olympic city selection process. This allowed the IPC the opportunity to gauge the intentions of candidate cities around hosting the Paralympics through the addition of specific topics in the questionnaires. This also allowed the IPC to establish its own selection commission alongside the IOC, however the two functioned independent from one another. When it became public that 5 cities had finalised the process to host the 2000 Summer Olympics, the IPC evaluated each separately and sent the name of the 4 four that fit within its expectations to host the Paralympics. Three cities (Beijing, Berlin and Manchester) were treating the Paralympics as an integral part of their bid, while Sydney, due to Australian legislation at the time, presented a separate bid supported by the Sydney Olympic Bid Committee which gave late but crucial support. While Berlin, Beijing and Manchester presented economically strong bids, Sydney presented simpler documentation, but technically better, which gave it advantages from the beginning. Unlike its competitors, the Australian bid was an adaptation of the Olympic project and promised the same conditions of accessibility and sporting performances. It became a consensus within the IPC that Sydney was the only viable bid, and in an unprecedented move, the 94 National Paralympic Committees at the 10th IPC Executive Board Session held in Berlin, Germany, unanimously awarded them the hosting rights by acclaimation.

Sydney was chosen as host for the XI Summer Paralympics on 11 September 1993, 12 days before the city was also chosen by the IOC to host the 2000 Summer Olympics. The official announcement was delayed until 4 days after the IOC decision due to the IPC being an interested party in the Olympic selection process, therefore opening the possibility of the IPC'S selection to interfere with that of the IOC. This also gave the IPC the opportunity to renegotiate with the Olympic host city had the IOC selected an alternate bid. Given the separate processes, the Paralympic Bid Committee led had to wait until the end of 1993 to sign the host city contract, with clear conditions given to Sydney that negotiations with Manchester would be initiated if the contract was not signed by the end of the year. Guarantees were also sought around the financial security of the games, and these were fulfilled following several rounds of negotiations between the Federal Government of Australia and the Government of the State of New South Wales.

This was the last time to date that the Paralympics host city was chosen in a process that was not linked to the Olympic Games. Starting with the 2004 Summer Games, the IOC demanded that host city applicants submitted their plans to host the Paralymic Games as a part of their Olympic proposals.

As it was selected as host at different moments, this was the last time in history that the Summer Olympics and Paralympics were organized by separate bodies, though administrative and financial decisions in all areas was jointly made, as the all common areas were the same.  Six years later when hosted the 2006 Winter Olympics and the Winter Paralympics. Turin, Italy had to separate the organization of the two events when there were 6 months left for the opening of the Paralympics for financial reasons.

Background to the bid process

Context before the Games 
There are several similarities between the 1996 and 2000 Summer Paralympics. The first is that the Organizing Committees of the respective Olympics held in the same cities did not want to commit to two events of the same size held in a short span of time under their custody. Even though Australia and the United States had tradition in the event, there was little recognition of it, though the resilience of the leaders of civil movements guaranteed the realization of the Paralympic Games in their respective cities.

History of the Paralympic Movement in Australia 
Despite having a historical tradition in the Paralympics and having participated (and won gold medals) in the previous eight summer editions, Australia had traditionally looked down on Paralympic sport, to the point that during the candidacy process for the 2000 Summer Games, and despite being chosen as the Australian bid for the 2000 Summer Olympics, Sydney had showed little or no interest in hosting the Paralympics and had not submitted any proposal about hosting the event.

This was one of the consequences of the tumultuous process surrounding the organization of the 1996 Summer Paralympics and the fact that Paralympic sport did not have a great penetration in the local media and society.

Not even expressive results, such as fifth place in the medal table at the 1992 Summer Paralympics held in Barcelona, drew attention in the same way that Paralympic sport was treated in other countries: some sectors of society treated the Paralympics as an event of "second class".

Even with the approximation of the IOC made in the second half of the 1980s by Juan Antonio Samaranch, they remained cold and cordial; however, the International Olympic Committee helped to reform the IPC with an administrative structure mirroring the one that was used by the IOC.

The process to host the Paralympic Games
But this help did not change the way in which the host cities of the Paralympic Games and their events were chosen at that time.

For the 1960 and 1964 Games, Rome and Tokyo had accepted the direct invitation made by the International Stoke Mandeville Games Committee and hosted the Paralympics some weeks after the Olympic Games, but in different conditions.

Despite having given initial guarantees in 1964, in 1966, alleging increased costs and lack of infrastructure, Mexico City withdrew from host the 1968 Summer Paralympics and in 1967, as part of Israel's celebrations for their 20th anniversary of independence, the Israeli government made a bid to host the Games in 1967.

The 1972 Summer Paralympics and the 1976 Summer Paralympics were held in the same countries (West Germany and Canada), but in different cities (Heidelberg and Toronto, respectively).

The Soviet Union rejected the hosting rights for the 1980 Summer Paralympics out of hand, also issuing the infamous statement that "There are no invalids in the USSR!" Following this, the Netherlands (Arnhem) immediately offered to host, which was accepted.

After these problems, an attempt was made to approach Los Angeles so that the original concept of "one city, two events" could be resumed. But even with potential sympathy on the part of LAOCOG, formal relations did not exist between the Stoke Mandeville Committee and the IOC, nor even between the various American Federations of Sports for the Disabled. In the midst of conversations between Los Angeles and the Stoke Mandeville Committee, it became public that the chosen funding model intentionally overlooked the holding of the Paralympics, and upon learning of this, those responsible for wheelchair sports in the United States decided to request the holding of their event separately.

After this decision, the concept of the same hosting country (US) was near to happen again, under an opt-out system in which wheelchair events would be at the University of Illinois Urbana-Champaign, and the another types of disabilities were scheduled for New York City: at the last minute the Illinois University withdrew, and the games returned to Stoke Mandeville.

This situation led the IOC to start talks with the 1988 hosts, Seoul, and the cities interested in hosting the 1992 Summer Olympics.In 1984,Seoul accepted the Games in a late stage but with a different Organizing Committee, who worked with alongside their Olympic counterparts. However, the SLOOC only accepted help in trivial matters such as logistical services and the training of volunteers, but the South Koreans held the Paralympics by removing some different elements (i.e. different venues and a specific Paralympic Village), as the Olympics had poor accessibility conditions, while all the apartments were sold on the guarantee that they would be delivered to their buyers the week after the Games ended.

Seoul would ultimately finance the Paralympics with the profits and extendend sponships quotas and ticket sells from the Olympic Games.

In 1987, Barcelona accepted the host of the 1992 Summer Paralympics  jointly and with the same Organizing Committee, and in order to give improve the event's quality and secure its future, the COOB '92 decided to standardize the entire classification system for athletes, which would give them the chance to have the same experiences and opportunities during the Paralympics.

Contrary to what had happened previously, the Spanish city managed to finance the Paralympics with the extension of existing sponsorship quotas and signed new contracts with new sponsors specifically for the Paralympics.But this was not enough to raise more funds, given the fact that the initial budget could not cover the costs of preparation and initially it was proposed to use more public resources so that other expenses could be covered. Soon after the first denial of extra support by the Spanish government for the Paralympic Games, COOB'92 received support from the third sector, through a partnership proposed by the Spain's National Organization for the Blind (ONCE).

The city still managed to receive some additional public funds, and had the support of the ONCE Foundation who helped the Paralympic division of the COOB'92 to turn a joint venture with also helped to organize and also added funds of its own, buying a minority stake and also acting as a manager of personnel and resources to be applied. ONCE's proposal perfectly fit the needs of COOB '92. And it included the idea that the Paralympic division would become a joint venture between the two interested parties.Thus,with a big political power, ONCE was predisposed to help the Paralympic division to seek new financial resources to cover the missing amounts. for volunteers who would work in services for athletes with disabilities.

After the Games in Catalonia, ONCE and COOB '92 also helped to organize the Paralympic Games for the Mentally Disabled, which were held in Madrid following the closing ceremonies in Barcelona.

Despite what had been agreed in 1989, in which Barcelona and Madrid would be the last Paralympics organized by the International Coordination Committee (ICC) and that from the Winter Games of 1994 onwards, the powers to organize the Paralympic Games would belong to the International Paralympic Committee (IPC). And despite the intentions of this institution to carry out the Paralympics and the Olympics jointly in the city, this ran the risk of not happening,as the Olympic Organizers "closed the doors" to the Paralympic Games "claiming that the financial potential of a niche event could lead to any risk of loss and huge net losses",and this led to a public outcry in the US and also led to actions by civil society and the third sector led by the Shepherd Center,a world know rehabilitation center.Due the lack of financial guarantees and other issues as the such as the non-involvement of local authorities.Due this situation, a Bid Committee led by the Sheperd Center members, signed a pre-contract with the IPC in 1991 and was only effectived as host city in March 1992,but the two events were in the responsibilities of two different organizers.

The impact of Barcelona and Atlanta at the bids for the 2000 Games

See also: 1984 Summer Olympics,1996 Summer Olympics, 1996 Summer Paralympics.

If the joint management of the 1992 Games opened up new possibilities for the Paralympic Games, the confusion and discredit surrounding the 1996 Games could cause enormous damage to the image of the Paralympics. As the events in Atlanta they had no relation,and were planned to held with two separate Organizing Committees, functioning simultaneously and without any communication and inexistent relations.Even Nagano,which would host the 1998 Winter Paralympics, was further ahead than Atlanta and provided more security for the International Paralympic Committee,
that despite having two separate organizations, the stakeholders were the same.

After the financial success of the 1984 Summer Olympics, "Olympic Fever" swept the United States and  their bids became common in the following years. 
Anchorage, Alaska applied  to host the 1992 and 1994 Winter Olympics without success, and Salt Lake City also applied for the 1998 Winter Olympics, before the Utah capital "bought" the bidding process and won the rights to host the 2002 Winter Olympics in 1995: three years later, the ensuing bribery scandal became public, leading to the biggest crisis in the history of the Olympic movement until the 2020 Summer Olympics were postponed.Considered short-term bids, both Atlanta and Salt Lake City had used as a guide the financing model of the 1984 Summer Olympics, when no public funds were invested in the organization of the Games.Unlike Sydney, all the competition venues were ready and were mostly from private institutions. During the bid, all sponsors and interested parties financed all the necessary works.

By choosing this model, however, the Atlanta Olympic Bid Committee, caused the Paralympic Games to be "forgotten", as seen from the loss of funding and low market potential, closing the door to any kind of damage to the image of the AOCOG. However, when this situation was discovered, this led to a severe public outcry. As Salt Lake City was already in the bidding process for the 2002 Winter Olympics,the International Olympic Committee changed the process and signed a strategic partnership with the International Paralympic Committee in 1994, making the compromise to host the Paralympics under the same umbrella and Organizing Committee.

Two committees, too much confusion

Initially, the fact was raised that AOCOG had purposely forgotten about the Paralympics, and the reasons became clear: the event lacked the potential economic returns, visibility and appeal of the Olympics. After this led to a civil movement led by the Sheppard Centre, it became possible that the 1996 Summer Paralympics would be held in Great Britain, with an unknown city having already signed a pre-contract as a reserve if Atlanta chose not to, or was unable to, host the Paralympic Games.

The Shepard Centre's effort worked despite pressure from the USOC and its sponsors, who thought the Paralympics were taking advantage of the Olympics, and also forced a boycott from them: to that end, major local companies had threatened to withdraw funding to the event.

Despite all this, the Atlanta experience turned out to be disastrous for everyone involved, with all the money raised being used to outsource the essential services at the venues to the AOCOG.

The Olympic bidding process

While all this confusion was going on, the process of choosing the host city for the 2000 Summer Olympic Games was already open, and eight National Olympic Committees showed their initial intentions to participate in the process: Australia, Brazil, China, Germany, Great Britain, Italy, Turkey and Uzbekistan, with six of them also showing interest in hosting the Paralympics, having "open arms and hearts" to the Paralympics in their bidding documents.

Throughout the process, and for several reasons, Brazil, Italy and Uzbekistan withdrew, with the other five bids being automatic finalists. When publishing this list, the IPC evaluated these candidates in parallel and announced that Turkey did not satisfy the conditions to host the Paralympic Games. However, the remaining four still faced different technical and feasibility requirements.

Sydney's reluctance to host the Paralympics

The Sydney 2000 Olympic Bidding Committee (SOBC) was initially not concerned with the Paralympic Games, and with several plausible arguments from the Australians:

 Firstly, the risk of costs related to an eventual victory at the respective process to host the Olympic Games and two weeks later, the Paralympic Games.
 Secondly, the city and the country did not have the practical conditions to host two events of the same size in such a short time.
 Thirdly, concerns that the same situation was happening in Atlanta, when the city hosted the two events, but with two completely different organizing committees that did not communicate with each other and turned both into disasters for all parties involved.

The low cooperation between the 1996 Summer Olympics Organizing Committee and its Paralympic counterpart also spilled over into the logistical and financial aspects. In Atlanta, several competition venues were more than 50 km from the Olympic Village and hotels and were outside the Olympic Ring, within universities that did not host any events at the Olympic Games.

Several forecasts by experts at the time said that this organizational model would not work, which was proven during the Games, particularly in the areas of logistics, ticket sales and marketing.

Confusion also reached in terms of financial support, even in the sale of corporate sponsorship quotas, while the Games suffered a boycott and numerous lawsuits filed by both the USOC and by the Olympic sponsors who alleged misuse of trademarks.

This alienation of sponsors forced the Organizing Committee of the Olympics to buy a small part of its counterpart for US$5 million,  and to oblige the Paralympic Committee not to contract sponsorship quotas from competitors - who were the Olympic sponsors - which was judicially proven the differences between the events.

Things significantly improved after the International Olympic Committee intervened and also bought a sponsorship share, as the remaining quotas of corporate sponsorship were bought by multinationals which had their world headquarters in the city (i.e. Coca-Cola, Delta Airlines and the Home Depot).

After the diabolical situation that the Atlanta Paralympic Committee was in became public, the IOC changed the rules to prevent a repeat: starting with the bid process for the 2002 Winter Olympics host city, it was required that each city interested in participating in the hosting process for the Olympic Games commit to publicizing its plans for the Paralympic Games, as the 1992 Summer Paralympics had been a success without precedence.

After extensive marketing research, those responsible for Sydney's bid also considered the fact that the reach of the Paralympic Games were small and limited, given the local public were not likely to receive the event positively. As there was no obligation at the time to also host the Paralympic Games, Sydney would only consider applying for the simultaneous organization of the two events if it won the Olympic bid.

This possibility did not interest the newly created Australian Paralympic Federation (APF), led by former athlete Ron Finneran, who was delighted with what had happened in recent editions of the Paralympic Games, where the same cities were hosting the Olympic Games. At the same time, the Atlanta Paralympics situation could help the rising importance and knowledge of the Paralympíc Movement around the world.

The Bid Committee did not trust the APF to the same level as the organizational capabilities of the IPC, because of the short time it had been in operation, the lack of administrative and financial experience, the lack of experience and structure, and because of what was going on in Atlanta.

The financial difficulties encountered by Atlanta had repercussions since the beginning of Sydney's plans: the APC was small, but had money to survive from its members and the Australian Government, though this would not be able to raise sufficient resources to promote the bid during 1992 and 1993.

Some time after this situation was resolved, new questions regarding the reliability of the APF were raised by Australian public opinion. There were so many doubts and uncertainties that TV networks in the country had no potential interest in broadcasting promotional videos or involvement in marketing functions.

At the same time, the Bid Committee was asked about sources of funding for the event, since the Paralympics did not have the market appeal of the Olympic Games and also, how the APF would be able to get other sources of private funding.

The beginning of the dream
With the successful integration in Barcelona, where the two events were marketed as a "60-day sporting celebration", the first contacts between the APF and the Sydney 2000 Bid Committee (SOBC) were made in 1991 and again in the first half of 1992.

However, like all previous Olympics host cities, the SOBC had no plans to bid for the Paralympics unless Sydney won the Olympic counterpart. The lack of knowledge of local legislation also hindered the planning of the APF.

Under Australian law, the SOBC was constituted as a "specific purpose entity", which barred any change in its composition. The SOBC operated as a joint venture company with a 100% of its composition divided into three equal parts: 33.3% owned by the Australian Olympic Committee, 33.3% owned by the Government of New South Wales and 33.3% owned by the Commonwealth of Australia.

Under the legislation, regardless of winning or losing the candidacy, at the end of the process it would have to be dissolved. Thus, these rules blocked any change in the composition, structure and functioning of the SOBC. As a result of this, the bid committee created by the APF had to do all the work alone.

After the announcement that of the five finalists, four satisfied the conditions to host the Paralympic Games (Beijing, Berlin, Manchester and Sydney) – technical infeasibility eliminated Istanbul – the IPC breathed a sigh of relief at that moment as three of these cities were proposing to "jointly organize the Olympic and Paralympic Games to save human and financial resources": the only bidding city that didn't propose this was Sydney.

After the decision was made by the IOC, Berlin was seen as favorites, as it was "considered the perfect proposal to celebrate the entry of the third millennium" as they wanted to celebrate the German reunification by hosting the Games. But the support of its bid was marred after anti-Olympic protesters marched through the city just four days before the final vote in Monaco, claiming that the Games would be using funds to further domestic reconstruction efforts.

The Manchester's bid book was believed to be strong, but was harmed by recurring delays in the regeneration process and the ongoing works at the historic center of the city, by criticism within Britain when its promotional videos and material featured videos and photos of the main tourist attractions of the capital London, such as Buckingham Palace and Tower Bridge, instead of Manchester's tourist attractions.

The first reactions in the UK were one of disbelief and embarrassment when the final presentation was taken in Monaco: many opinions in the editorials in national and local newspapers the following day concluded "Manchester is in a severe identity crisis", and even with Great Britain being the "spiritual home of Paralympic sport", Manchester's candidacy was being rejected by political force, along with several failures - the most glaring being their proposal to hold the Paralympic Games over 15 days, whereas the maximum allowed at the time was 12.

A review of the failed project was submitted two years later to the Commonwealth Games Federation (CGF), and the city was eventually  named as the host of the 2002 Commonwealth Games.

Along Berlin, the city was seen as a favorite due to the bid book stating "The Paralympic Games will be jointly financed with the Olympic Games and athletes will have the same opportunities and conditions offered to their Olympic counterparts".

Beijing had very weak arguments, similar to those of Milan (who withdrew), though Beijing stated that "the city would accept the mission of organizing and hosting the Paralympic Games, and that the financing would be the same".

However, that the entire project would be developed jointly between BOBICO and the IPC, respecting all international rules and legislation. Despite this, the Chinese bid was still frowned upon because of issues relating to the protests in Tiananmen Square in 1989, along with weak legislation related to the disabled and the accessibility of public places.

With all these problems seeing the other candidates eliminated, only the APF candidacy remained, which also faced serious problems: despite being the only viable candidate, there were still no financial and structural guarantees.

During the first phase of feasibility studies, the Sydney 2000 Olympic Bid Committee had rejected the holding of the Paralympics, haunted by the perfect storm that was brewing in Atlanta, who were organizing its event with two non-communicating organizing committees that operated completely independently.

The result of an "oversight" on the part of the Atlanta 1996 Bidding Committee, the Paralympic Games were only saved due to a collective action on the part of civil society and the administrators of the Shepard Center, who assumed the candidacy and eventually the management of the Games: at that time, they also had financial uncertainties which were only resolved at the last minute, when large companies and multinationals based in the city bought the sponsorship quotas, and when the situation became public after several reports, claimed that the Paralympics were undergoing "a corporate boycott" headed by the United States Olympic Committee (USOC).

Sydney did not originally submit any documents regarding the holding of the Paralympic Games, which angered the Paralympics Australia, as the funding for the Olympics was secured: it seemed there was no realistic prospect of any funding for the Paralympics.

A few days later, when the application documents were released and the applications were accepted, it was reported that all cities except Sydney had given guarantees to host the Paralympics. Berlin and Manchester were still committed to financing and organizing the Paralympic Games with the same Organizing Committee and joint investment.

This triggered a red light for the SOBC: the bid planning needed to be redone, and a chapter on the Paralympic Games was included at the last minute.

However, it was clear that the two events would be organized by two separate Organizing Committees. Immediately, the bid consultants advised the SOBC to reconsider its decision, and reluctantly they accepted this: it was claimed that the "rejection of the Paralympic Games could be considered a weakness for Sydney" and that "important votes for the end could be lost".

Against its will, the SOBC approached the APF and tried to change its statute and the entire project to include the plans for the Paralympic Games, but the legislation in force in Australia at that time barred this structural change.

While the possibility of what was happening in Atlanta could repeat were real, the APF's resilience was what kept their hopes alive.

Third phase: the fight continues
While the period of presentations was approaching, SPBC was structured. With a simpler and more modest structure than the other candidates as consequences of the lack of financial, organizational and structural support.
.As the final evaluations approached, the Sydney bidding committee for the 2000 Summer Paralympics was structured in a simpler and more modest way than the other bidders as a consequence of it being operating separately and also because there wasn't had the structural, financial and organizational support of the Olympic Committee. Despite being there competing, Sydney's candidacy had more work than her competitors because of this lack of support. Sydney had a lot more work than the other competitors.

The APF's resilience
The APF presented throughout the process a surprising level of articulation, willpower and organization for an institution that had only been in operation for two and half years. In its first months of operation, the APF formally assumed the functions of the Bid Committee for the 2000 Summer Paralympic Games (SBPG).

After the Australian Confederation of Sports for the Disabled (ACSD) ceased operations on 31 December 1989, the APF had the same functions and attributions that today belong to the Australian Paralympic Committee (APC).

In addition to these roles, they took on the duties and the matters of Sydney's bid for the 2000 Summer Paralympics. The APF also had the tasks of organizing its staff and interested parties, convincing skeptics about Australia's ability to host, organize and manage the Paralympic Games after the Olympics (hosted at a level of excellence never  before seen), and show that a potential Paralympic edition on Australian soil could be a perfect opportunity to demonstrate that parathletes are part of Australian society, and that they have enormous potential to demonstrate their inclusion and diversity.

The APC's arguments had previously been used successfully when they convinced former Prime Minister Bob Hawke to sponsor the foundation of the APF: nobody imagined that Australia would consolidate itself in the Paralympic movement in the same way as in the Olympic movement, or even that this would be done in just sx years. As a courtesy from the NSW Government, APC would gain an office at the New South Wales Sport House.

Third phase: "We are on this"
The activities and the work of the Bid Committee gained greater intensity as 1992 drew to a close: the APC would have to present its project to external and interested parties.

At the same time that the engagement and involvement of the population in the Olympic bid increased, the rejection of the Paralympics grew in the same way. For many, the work of the APF was considered "opportunistic" and "rude", while others understood that there was an "obligation for pity". With this negativity growing, the APF continued to do its job, while the difficulties continued to increase everyday.

Taking advantage of this and the increasingly shorter deadline for sending the necessary documentation - this was to be delivered to the IPC by 21 March 1993.

The late Adrienne Smith, who was then working as the executive secretary of the APC, sat down at a table with several consultants of the SOBC: in just eight weeks, Smith and the SOBC drew up the bid project that would be handed over to the IPC executive board in a meeting scheduled for Lillehammer,  Norway. In a surprise action, the APF managed to add the letters of intent signed by the prime minister, the governor of NSW, and the mayor of Sydney.

At this meeting, the four candidate cities were aware of what their competitors were proposing to the IPC and, for the first time, face-to-face meetings between the members of these candidacy committees took place.

Some of the Australian journalists who were accompanying the Sydney delegation reported that "the APF Committee made a functional and realistic presentation, but which in comparison was much simpler and more modest than the others". As a sign of courtesy, approach and recognition, the SOBC paid the expenses for the trip to Norway and integrated the delegation and its executive manager, though the SBPC was responsible for printing all its promotional material, the necessary documentation and the application book (which were scarce compared to that of other cities).

Same sources that reported that the other three candidates "were very well represented" and all had "convincing and more strong arguments": a member of the Australian delegation even declared that "if we had a small team, all the work would be more difficult to do", scolding the local society by declaring that "there was an implicit lack of respect for the importance of the event, as it equated to the choice of the Olympic host city".

During the Lillehammer presentation, it was announced that the first estimated budget for the Paralympic Games was expected to be more than AU$84 million and this would be financed by the sale of sponsorship quotas, tickets, licensed products, marketing actions, and contributions from the Governments of New South Wales and Australia. It was not reported at the time how much was intended to be gained from the sale of media rights.

1993: almost everything collapses

1993 was the most important year for the ambitions of SOBC and SBPC: January could not have started better, as the APF was able to confirm that it had obtained the formal and official support of the governmental spheres involved.

A few days before the trip to Norway, the Federal Minister of Sports of Australia, Ros Kelly, confirmed that formal and official support from the SOBC was ratified and they would be partners for whatever the APC needed. Kelly also confirmed that letters of intent were being sent by these government levels.

It seemed that with this public support, everything would be solved. But after several denials, the most worrying issues would resurface: even with all the accepted and well-structured arguments, the APF still had not obtained the financial guarantees and it was feared that any request for financial assistance would be seen as a provocation.

Since at that time, the APF was not in a position to support itself financially - nor would its members be able to raise funds and finance all the costs of the bid and the Games itself - if Sydney was the winner.

The concern was valid because the choice of the Paralympics host would be before the Olympic host, and any eventual failure it could spill over into the Olympic candidacy. Further to this, there were studies that reported that the Paralympic Games had "low marketing potential" and did not have "the same commercial attraction as the Olympic Games".

In this letter there was relevant information that "in the first months, the SOBC had guided the APF to look for other forms of financing that were not public" and "we cannot finance you in any way". This thinking was gradually changing, and the SOBC became ready some time later to help the SPBC in whatever it needed. The SOBC had even guided the APF to look for other sources of income for its candidacy.

This statement came at the same time that the APF admitted that it did not even have the capacity to pay the US$50,000 if Sydney did win the hosting rights.

After becoming aware of this dire situation, Finneran sent a letter informing the minister that their recent studies determined that the costs to host the Paralympic Games would be AU$82.67 million, of which the SOBC would provide AU$15 million from the ticket sales. The sales of sponsorship, tickets, related events such as fundraising and licensed products were expected to generate another AU$14.49 million, leaving a deficit of AU$53.18 million.

Finnegan raised an even more urgent situation, the difficulty of carrying out a separate marketing campaigns for the two events, as required by the SOBC and the IOC itself, and announced a joint campaign by the two bids, understanding that the function would be to maximize opportunities to acquire unified actions as same sponsors as well as private sector funding.

However, the dice had already been rolled and the main challenge now was the candidacy itself, and the city's preparation for the IPC inspection visits that were scheduled for May and June of that year, as it had already been announced that the city's bid proposal had been accepted. As per the rules of the final process, the final report would be released and the members of APF would have to make a final presentation before the then 94 National Paralympic Committees members of the IPC in Berlin, Germany, on 12 September 1993.

This selection was made eleven days before the 101st Session of the International Olympic Committee that was to be held in Monte Carlo, Monaco. However, the signing of the city contract would have to wait, as this depended on the decision of the Olympic host: on 23 September, Sydney won the hosting rights in an upset, beating the favorite, Beijing, by just two votes. Thus, for the eighth time in history, the same city would host the Olympic and Paralympic Games in the same year: the SOBC had chosen 16 September – 1 October to hold the Olympic Games, while the APF chose  14–26 October to hold the Paralympic Games.

After the win, Smith – now  executive manager of the SPBC – commented that "we couldn't go public because if we did it would have ruined the Olympic bid. We had no acknowledgement of financial support from the government until the day of the bid in September 1993."

Between these actions, Smith, Finneran, and members of SOBC also ensured in a letter to the IOC, IPC and Australian and New South Wales authorities that if Sydney won both bids, the Paralympic athletes would have the same treatment, conditions and support as their Olympic counterparts as happened in Barcelona, but in a better and innovative way. This was unprecedented, and would become a turning point for the Paralympic Games.

After the elections: first innovative proposal 
A few days after taking office, on 19 April 1993, Finneran wrote a new letter to the Minister explaining that either the APF or the Australian disability sports community were unable to accept responsibility for the financial contributions or otherwise for organizing the Games, even if they are submitting a bid. In the same letter, he further proposed that al the organization and the marketing of the Olympic and Paralympic Games was done under a same banner and this would be the best solution to ensure a successful delivery of the 2000 Summer Olympic and Paralympic Games.

At the first days of May 1993, a small Committee was organized by the APF and during the first meetings, a document described as a "white paper" was written. This document had the function of guiding all the actions that would be taken from there in the Australian bid. Another main objective was also to base its clear foundations with the government and consolidate the bid arguments in all the process. After the ending of the series of meetings, Finneran sent the White Paper to his board on 12 May 1993, drawing attention with the following written statement made at the beginning message "the white paper … clearly states to all directors involved, the position of the Australian Paralympic Federation and therefore the position of the Sydney 2000 Paralympic Bidding Committee (SPBC) in relation to the conditions under which the Paralympic Games will be held if Sydney wins the bid."

Costs 
The Sydney 2000 Paralympic Bidding Committee (SPBC) outlined that a budget of AUD$84 million (near AUD$188 million in 2022) would be required to stage the games, largely coming from revenue from ticket sales, sponsorship quotas, licensed products, charities and marketing, with smaller contributions expected from the federal and New South Wales state governments. The initial budget had not forecast possible income relating to the sale of media rights to the games. Market research at the time indicated that the Paralympic Games had "little potential" compared to its Olympic counterpart and it was "uncertain and risky to invest in an event with no certain return", making the games a difficult sell to potential sponsors.

In 1993, the head of the Australian Paralympic Federation (APF) Ron Finneran presented the Federal Government with a revised budget of AU$82.67 million (AUD $185.48 million in 2023). Of this, the SOBC were prepared to commit $15 million, with a further $14.49 million expected from ticket sales, quotas and sponsorship partnerships and other actions, leaving a budget shortfall of AU$58.33 million. On 1 October 1993, the Daily Telegraph reported that AUD$65 million (AUD$145.83 million in 2023) had been allocated for the budget of the Sydney Paralympic Games. Around AUD$40 million (AUD$100.96 million) was committed from the New South Wales Government, after the state Premier committed to recover more than 50% of the money from other budget sources. The Federal Government allocated another AUD$25 million (AUD$56.06 million).

The final estimates for the games came to  AUD$157 million (AUD$325.25 million in 2023), with the NSW Government and Commonwealth Government contributing AUD$25 million each (AUD$56.09 million in 2023 values). The Sydney Organising Committee for the Olympic Games (SOCOG) contributed AUD$18 million (AUD$40.38 million in 2023 values), within the bid estimates. The Sydney Paralympic Organising Committee (SPOC) signed the host city contract with the recently formed International Paralympic Committee in 1993, a few days after the city had been chosen to host the 2000 Summer Olympics. This contract outlined the SPOC's obligations in hosting the Paralympic Games. To cover the remaining costs, revenue was raised via sponsorships quotas shared with SOCOG and ticket sales. The 110,000-seat Stadium Australia was completed three months early in February 1999, this stadium was funded mainly by the private sector at an estimated cost of AUD$690 million (AUD$1.548.090.000 in 2023 values), the Government contributed AUD$124 million (AUD$278.210 million in 2023) to this project. Though there was no budgeted profit, repayments to the State and Federal Governments were prioritised in the event of profit being made. In October 1998, governing bodies of the Olympics and Paralympics initiated a joint call for volunteers. An estimated total of forty-one thousand Australians answered this call, non-including those sourced from specialist community groups.

Environment

In an innovative way, the Olympic and Paralympic project had as the major focus, the completion of the first stage of the Millennium Parklands. This is composed of 450 hectares of landscape, with up to 40 kilometers of pedestrian and cycle trails. This major first stage included focus on the surrounding Olympic and Paralympic facilities, providing a beautiful landscape for recreational activities, conservation and environmental education/preservation. During this time work on the Water Reclamation and Management Scheme (WRAMS) will continue to progress. The WRAMS will be in use during the games with the first stage (recycled water to be used for flushing and irrigation) to be implemented. This system will continue after the games, and will be fully developed after the games has been completed. The WRAMS system is only one of the many water saving management strategies to be used during the games period. Plans to use stormwater runoff from Newington to be used as irrigation and a requirement for Olympic venues to utilise water saving techniques and devices are also some of the other water saving plans. Stormwater from the Stadium Australia roof is to be collected and used to irrigate the central stadium. An environmental education program is also delivered throughout 1999–2000 to ensure that Homebush Bay and the Sydney 2000 Olympic and Paralympics continues to be recognised for their commitment to the environment after their end.

Administration
The 2000 Paralympic Games were governed and overseen by the International Paralympic Committee (IPC), led by President Robert Steadward. The Games were organised by the Sydney Paralympic Organising Committee (SPOC) led by President Dr John Grant and chief executive officer Lois Appleby. The Sydney 2000 Summer Olympic Games Organizing Committee (SOCOG) was established at the same time and placed SPOC as a subsidiary company within its structure. Sydney 2000 Summer Paralympic Games Organizing Committee (SPOC) on 12 November 1993 by the Australian Government Office of Olympic Co-ordination. In January 1995, SPOC and SOCOG became public companies controlled by the Government, receiving support by both State and Commonwealth Governments. The two companies had the same board of directors composed of members appointed by Premier, Minister for the Olympics, the Federal Treasurer and the Minister for Sports and Recreation conducted the joint administration. As their Olympic counterpart the SPOC was responsible for planning and staging the Sydney 2000 Paralympic Games including the tickets and information services, the disability categorisation, converting Olympic venues to Paralympic venues, conducting public events, facilitating drug testing, arranging broadcasting, housing for athletes, arranging medal ceremonies, transporting athletes and conducting the Paralympic torch relay. Along the IPC, the SPOC also had the responsibilities to regulated the use of Paralympic Games brand and images. Subsequently, a Committee was created that involved all interested parties in the conduction of the Olympic and Paralympic Games. Known as the Joint Working Group was established in June 1997, linking the Boards of both the SPOC and the SOCOG. On 29 November of the same the Sydney Games Administration Act 2000 was passed at the parliament. This specific legislative act forced the dissolution of the SOCOG and SPOC from 1 January 2001,and their assets and liabilities were transferred to the Olympic Coordination Authority (OCA).

On 23 January 1997, the International Paralympic Committee appointed the Spaniard Xavier Gonzales as General Manager of Sports and Competition Venues. He had held the same roles during the Barcelona Olympic and Paralympic Games in 1992 and also at the Atlanta Summer Paralympics in 1996,supervising more than 3 thousand athletes in 21 competition venues and also in supplementary/auxiliary ones. Gonzales was also responsible for finalizing the sporting program, the final calendar of the Games together shared responsibility with each of the managers from each sport and venue. Due the specifics of your work,Gonzales was the only non-Australian to occupy a position in the Organizing Committee.

Transport and logistics operations
Contrary to what happened in Atlanta, when the responsibilities of transport, logistics and movement were shared and the city during the Olympic and Paralympic Games turned into chaos, local authorities in Sydney understood that there was a real need for transport and logistics operations to be carried out in a unified way. So that this did not happen because of the distances that in the city were greater than in the American city, understood that all transport and logistics operations would have to be centralized and unified transport and road services during the Olympic and Paralympic Games, under the auspices of the Olympic Transport and Roads Authority (SORTA). In addition to the roads and logistics of the Games, this body was also responsible for the railways, since a good part of the movements of the Games were made by train, subway and surface subway.

Political context

The Sydney 2000 Summer Paralympic was only the sixth time that the Summer Paralympics were hosted at the same city as the Olympic Games and the fifth that they were organized by a different organizing committee. Contrary to what was expected, the 16 days of transition between the Games (2 to 18 October 2000) were very tense for the Sydney and New South Wales authorities. Some hours after the ending of Olympics Closing Ceremonies, was turned public that the SOCOG and the city hall jointly decided to remove the gigantic Olympic rings from the Harbour Bridge. This decision ended up overshadowing the Aboriginal ritual in which the Paralympic torch would be lit at the foot of Australian Parliament Hill in Canberra. A few hours later, the chairman of SOCOG, Michael Knight, publicly announced that he would no longer participate in public events related to the Paralympic Games. For the Australian public opinion, this was seen this decision was frowned upon and was also seen as insensitive authoritarian and self-centered attitude towards the Paralympic Games. Subsequently, SOCOG marked for a next day a public celebration dedicated to the volunteers who worked for the success of the Games. However, the local authorities knew that this celebration would coincide with the arrival of the Paralympic torch in the city and refused to re-mark this celebration.

With a few months to go until the opening ceremony,SOCOG was taken by surprise,when they found out behind the scenes that the pop diva Kylie Minogue and group Yothu Yindi were going to headline the Paralympic opening ceremonies.Some hours before this announcement becomes public, the Olympic organisers, quickly made an invitation to Minogue and Yothu Yindi to participate at the Opening Ceremonies. But, was already known in Australia that Minogue was not able to be at the country on that week, because she had a full schedule in Europe to promote the upcoming release from the Light Years album scheduled for the upcoming week and wouldn't have time to get to Sydney before the ceremony. Kylie and the band performed at the Olympics Closing Ceremonies instead.

Controversies

The Sydney 2000 Paralympic Games were marred by a scandal which saw a classification of athletes removed from the next two Summer Paralympics. Fernando Vicente Martin, former head of the Spanish Federation for Mentally Handicapped Sports, allowed athletes with no disabilities to compete at the Games in order to win the gold medal. The team at the centre of the row was the Spanish basketball team, who won the gold medal in the Basketball ID, beating Russia 87–63, despite fielding a team mainly composed of athletes with no intellectual disability. It was claimed that at least 10 of the 12 Spanish players had no disability, rather were recruited to improve the team's performance and guarantee future funding. Martin was later suspended by the IPC and expelled by the Spanish Paralympic Committee.

The athletes were quickly exposed and the IPC reacted by removing all events from the following Games for athletes with intellectual disabilities. The decision was overturned 12-years later in London. Along with the controversy surrounding the Spanish basketball team, the games turned over 11 positive doping tests out of a total 630. Of these 11 positive tests, 10 were from male athletes and 1 from a female athlete. This leaves the games with the highest number of positive tests from the 1992 – 2008 Paralympics.

Mascot

The mascot for the 2000 Paralympics was "Lizzie" the Frill-necked Lizard.

Logo 
The Sydney 2000 Summer Paralympics logo was developed by marketing agency FHA Image Design from Melbourne and went public on 18 October 1997, 3 years before the opening ceremony in a public event at the Homebush Bay precinct. 

The victorian agency was already involved with all the visual planning for both the Olympics and the Paralympics and unified several visual elements of the two events such as the pictograms,the street signals and the trademarks under the name of "Sydney 2000".The 2000 Summer Paralympic Games logo was a representative of a dynamic human form leaping triumphantly forward and 'breaking through' towards the games.

The logo came to life with the design of the Paralympic torch and with the visual identity of the event that was focused on the energy dissipated by the paralympic athletes.It represents the energy dissipated by a paralympic athlete when "breaking a barrier" or a "wall of bricks, concrete or glass".This is also reflected in the Paralympic spirit, composed at the time by the motto of "body, mind and spirit".

Another image that can be seen in it is the Paralympic torch that is in a handover position for the next carrier in inspiring views to the world and the future with the use of Futura Typeface to write the games,host city's and year's names.The host's unique characteristics are seen in the fact that it also refers to the Sydney Opera House and Sydney Harbour with its sea and the boats that are part of the most famous cityscape around the world, through the use of three graphic shapes who refer to this feature.The agency even developed unique tones of the 3 colors of the Paralympic flag to represent unique characteristics of the host country: the blue represented the two oceans that bathe Australia: the Indian Ocean and the Pacific Ocean, the warm red of the Outback and a lush forest green which represent the Australia's endemic plants and animal species. The logo also embodies the host city vitality, Australia's spirit, and the achievements of a Paralympic athlete.

Ceremonies

The opening ceremony commenced on Wednesday 18 October at 8.00 pm with over 6000 performers and volunteers taking part. The show started by the Australian artist Jeffrey St. John sang the national anthem "Advance Australia Fair" and "The Challenge" at. The 2-hours and half ceremonies ended Kylie Minogue with a "Waltzing Matilda" special version, her rendition of Kool & the Gang's "Celebration" and her current hit "Spinning Around". Australian actor Bryan Brown was selected as ceremony narrator for the evening. Other performers for the Opening Ceremony included the band Yothu Yindi, Nathan Cavaleri, Melissa Ippolito, Taxiride, Billy Thorpe, Jack Thompson, Renee Geyer, Tina Harris, Vanessa Amorosi and Christine Anu. Australian country artist Graeme Connors sang his song "Being Here", as the event official theme song. Addresses were given by John Grant, president of the SPOC, and Robert Steadward, president of the IPC, prior to Sir William Deane declaring the official opening of the games. This was followed by Tracey Cross, a blind swimmer, taking the oath on behalf of the athletes and Mary Longden, an Equestrian referee, taking the oath on behalf of the officials.

The Paralympic torch relay final legs ended with Louise Sauvage, who lit the cauldron.

The closing ceremony took place on Sunday 29 October at 7.30 pm. The athletes intermingled with other nations and took to the stage for a party filled with fire, emotion and celebration. As there were several uncertainties about whether Athens would be able to host the next games, they had not yet signed the host city contract and were in the midst of public disagreements between the IPC itself and the IOC over delays related to a lot of legal issues. Due to this, several changes were made to the protocol. The first was that the Greek hymn was not performed during the ceremonies and no reference to Athens or Greece was made in the performances and the final speeches. As a sign of repudiation of the heaviest criticisms made so far by international entities, the Athens Organizing Committee for the Olympic Games (ATHOC) and the Greek government boycotted the ceremonies in a counterpart action. As a sign of goodwill for the resumption of talks between all stakeholders, Athens was responsible for mediating the conflict, sending a small delegation to Sydney, led by the then-deputy mayor Nikos Yiatrakos, who received the Paralympic flag on behalf of all of Greece (since the protocol determined that the Greek Paralympic Committee would receive the flag, but it did not exist until the following year), implying that Greece had accepted the criticisms about the organization of the Paralympics and was open to talking and negotiating the resolution of the issues that still prevented the legal security of the 2004 Summer Paralympics. To ensure there wasn't a gap in this part of the ceremony, the Australian producers invited the Millennium Choir of the Greek Orthodox Archdiocese of Australia to perform some typical Greek music. The music chosen by the conductor was "Tis ikiosinis ilie" ("Sun of Justice", from the movie soundtrack Zorba the Greek). To close the ceremonies, the first Australian group to make international success outside the country, The Seekers, closed the games with "The Carnival Is Over". Due to an accident some days before the event resulting in a broken hip, the singer Judith Durham sang the song sitting in a wheelchair.

Calendar
In the following calendar for the 2000 Summer Paralympics, each blue box represents an event competition. The yellow boxes represent days during which medal-awarding finals for a sport were held. The number in each yellow box represents the number of finals that were contested on that day.

Venues 
In total 12 venues were used at the 2000 Summer Olympics were used at the Games in Sydney.

Sydney Olympic Park

Olympic Stadium: Ceremonies (opening/closing), Athletics
Sydney Olympic Park Tennis Centre: Wheelchair Tennis
State Sports Centre: Table Tennis
Sydney International Aquatic Centre: Swimming
Sydney International Archery Park: Archery
State Hockey Centre: Football-7-side
Sydney Showground Pavilions:ID Basketball,Goalball, Wheelchair Basketball (secondary venue), Wheelchair Rugby,Powerlifiting, Wheelchair Fencing, Sitting Volleyball and Standing Volleyball
Sydney SuperDome: Wheelchair Basketball (main venue)

Sydney

Centennial Parklands: Road Cycling
Dunc Gray Velodrome: Track Cycling
Sydney International Equestrian Centre: Equestrian
Olympic Sailing Shore Base: Sailing
Sydney International Shooting Centre: Shooting

Torch relay

The MAA Torch Relay main objectives were to develop a route and an event which would help maintain momentum and  the engagement between the Sydney 2000 Olympic and Paralympic Games, promote the Paralympic Games and encourage ticket purchases. It was also to safely deliver the Paralympic flame to the Opening Ceremony.

While the relay visited each Australian capital city, it also focused strongly on Sydney and the surrounding regions, as this was the main catchment area for ticket sales.

The Paralympic Torch Relay succeeded in generating community and media support for the Games, with crowds in many areas and significant crowds lining the Sydney metropolitan route in the final two days of the relay.

The flame was created from burning eucalyptus leaves in a special lighting ceremony at Parliament House, Canberra, on 5 October 2000, and involved 920 torchbearers in each capital of Australian state, each of whom carried the flame an average of 500 metres.

After visiting each capital city (except Sydney) by air and land in counterclockwise a way,the torch entered New South Wales (NSW) from Moss Vale through the Southern Highlands, Illawarra, Campbelltown, Penrith, Windsor, Hunter and Central Coast areas before heading to Sydney Metropolitan Region.

Highlights included:

 The creation of the Paralympic flame during an Indigenous lighting ceremony on the forecourt of Parliament House, Canberra, with Paralympian David Hall as the first torchbearer. The Australian Prime Minister was present.
 The use of a Royal Australian Air Force Falcon 900 executive jet to convey the Paralympic flame around Australia.
 The Paralympic flame being carried across the arch of the Sydney Harbour Bridge (17 October 2000) by four torchbearers.

Sports and impairment groups 
The final program of the Games was presented by the Executive Council of the IPC in a meeting that took place between 12 and 16 March 1997 in Sweden. At this same meeting, SPOC presented its sustainability policies that were developed in a connected way and mirrored those implemented by SOOCOG. This program proposals needed to be independently approved by both the IPC and SPOC. The first draft program was turned public at the day 8 August 1997,and some changes were made in comparation to Atlanta, including the removal of 4 events in table tennis, 3 in shooting and 3 more in cycling. However, the program for the intellectually disabled has been expanded. For this disability, 14 new events in athletics, 18 in swimming and 2 in table tennis were added. Also an ID basketball tournament with 8-teams was also added. Track cycling has had its program completely overhauled and 9 new events have been added. Following its Olympic version, Powerlifting won 10 all-female events, wheelchair rugby and sailing officially became a Paralympic sports and with that the rugby tournament was expanded from 6 to 8 teams and single-handed 2.4mR event was added. Later, during the IPC executive board meeting held during the 1998 Winter Paralympics held in Nagano, Japan, it was decided that lawn bowls would be officially removed from the Paralympic program starting from Sydney, due to the low number of countries participating in Atlanta, when it was included as an optional sport.

 Archery
 Athletics
 Basketball ID
 Boccia
 Cycling
 Equestrian
 Football 7-a-side
 Goalball 
 Judo
 Powerlifting
 Sailing
 Shooting
 Swimming
 Table tennis
 Volleyball (sitting and standing)
 Wheelchair basketball
 Wheelchair fencing
 Wheelchair rugby
 Wheelchair tennis
Impairment groups for the games included:
 Amputees
 Blind & Visually Impaired
 Cerebral Palsied
 Intellectually Disabled
 Les Autres and 
 Spinal Cord Injuries

Games highlights
The Sydney Paralympics were deemed the "best Games ever" by Dr. Robert Steadward (then president of the International Paralympic Committee).  The games were Australia's most successful in history, with the nation achieving their highest medal count.  Of the 149 medals won, 63 were gold, 39 silver, and 47 were bronze, from ten different sports. Ticket sales exceeded organisers' initial targets, with 1.1 million tickets sold; nearly twice that of the 1996 Summer Paralympics.

The Australian team had a number of notable gold medal-winning performances. Individual achievements included swimmer Siobhan Paton's six gold medals in the 200m SM14 individual medley, and S14 100m freestyle, 50m butterfly, 50m backstroke, 200m freestyle, and 50m freestyle. She set nine world records in the process.

Tim Sullivan topped the track and field medal tally with five gold medals.  Sullivan won three gold medals in the T38 200m, 100m, and 400m events, and won two gold medals in relay events alongside Darren Thrupp, Adrian Grogan and Kieran Ault-Connell (T38 4X400m and 4X100m races).  The top performing female track and field athlete was Lisa Llorens, who won three gold medals from the F20 high jump, long jump and T20 200m.  Llorens also won a silver medal in the T20 100m. Other track medallists included Neil Fuller won two golds in the T44 200m, and 400m events, as well as one individual bronze medal in the T44 100m.  Fuller later combined with Tim Matthews, Stephen Wilson and Heath Francis to win another two gold medals in the T45 4X100m relay and T46 4X400m relay. Heath Francis went on to win a total of three golds and one silver after also winning an individual gold and silver in the T46 400m and T46 200m events respectively. Other track medallists were Amy Winters with two golds in the T46 200m and 100m T46, and a bronze in the T46 400m. Greg Smith also won three gold medals in the 800m, 5,000m and 1,500m T52 events.

In Cycling, Matthew Gray won two golds in the velodrome in the individual cycling mixed 1 km time trial LC1, and a gold in the mixed team sprint with Paul Lake and Greg Ball. Sarnya Parker and Tania Morda also won two golds in the women's cycling tandem 1 km time trial and women's tandem cycling individual pursuit open.

Medal count

A total of 1657 medals were awarded during the Sydney games: 550 gold, 549 silver, and 558 bronze. The host country, Australia, topped the medal count with more gold medals and more medals overall than any other nation. Great Britain took the most silver medals, with 43, and tied Australia for the most bronze medals, with 47.

In the table below, the ranking sorts by the number of gold medals earned by a nation (in this context a nation is an entity represented by a National Paralympic Committee). The number of silver medals is taken into consideration next and then the number of bronze medals.

Participating delegations 

One-hundred and twenty-three delegations participated in the Sydney Paralympics. Included among them was a team of "Individual Paralympic Athletes" from East Timor. The newly independent country had not yet established a National Paralympic Committee, so the International Paralympic Committee invited East Timorese athletes to compete at the games under the title of Individual Paralympic Athletes.

Barbados, Benin, Cambodia, El Salvador, Laos, Lebanon, Lesotho, Madagascar, Mali, Mauritania, Mongolia, Palestine, Rwanda, Samoa, Turkmenistan, Vanuatu and Vietnam competed for the first time.

 
 
 
 
 
 
 
 
 
 
 
 
 
 
 
 
 
 
 
 
 
  Chinese Taipei (25)
 
 
 
 
 
 
 
 
 
 
 
 
 
 
 
 
 
 
 
 
 
 
 
  Individual Paralympic Athletes (2)

Media coverage 
Media coverage of the Paralympic Games has steadily increased over the years.

In the table below, the approximate number of accredited media at the Paralympic Summer Games from 1992 to 2008 has been listed.

The Canadian Broadcasting Corporation had approximately 200 staff in Sydney for the Olympic games, 6 of whom stayed on to cover the Paralympic games.  The Canadian Broadcasting Corporation aired four one-hour shows of the Paralympic Games after the event was finished.

TV New Zealand also aired four one-hour specials of the games post event.

In the United States, CBS broadcast a special called Role Models for the 21st Century: The Sydney 2000 Paralympic Games. The special was two hours long and aired in November.

The British Broadcasting Corporation (BBC) allowed viewers the opportunity to express their opinions towards the games. Comments were posted under the heading "Has the Sydney Paralympics been a success?" on their website. One viewer, Carole Neale from England, was cited as posting: "I am so disappointed to find the coverage limited to less than an hour per evening, on at a time when most people are still travelling home from work, and dismissed to BBC2, unlike the Olympics which had a prime time evening slot on BBC1 as well as constant live coverage".

Views
Dame Tanni Grey-Thompson, multiple Paralympic gold medallist for Great Britain, later said of the Sydney Games:

See also

 2000 Summer Olympics
 2032 Summer Paralympics
 Cheating at the Paralympic Games
2000 Summer Paralympics medal table

Bibliography
 Sydney Paralympic Organising Committee Annual Report. 1995–2000

References

External links

"Participation Numbers: Sydney 2000 Paralympic Games", International Paralympic Committee

 
2000
2000 in Australian sport
2000 in multi-sport events
Australia at the Paralympics
Multi-sport events in Australia
International sports competitions hosted at Sydney Olympic Park
October 2000 sports events in Australia
2000s in Sydney